Marseille is a 2004 German drama film directed by Angela Schanelec. It was screened in the Un Certain Regard section at the 2004 Cannes Film Festival.

Synopsis
Sophie, a young photographer, does an apartment swap with Zelda from Marseille in February, so she can get away from Berlin. While Marseille appears harsh and closed in the bright sun, she starts photographing the city. In a car repair garage, she meets Pierre, a young mechanic who lends her his car, and she drives around. They meet again that night and spend the evening in a bar, fascinated by the lightness of not knowing about each other until one of Pierre's acquaintances comes. The next night, Sophie joins Pierre and his friends to go dancing. One very sharp cut later, Sophie is back in Berlin and her old life. There is her best friend Hanna, who is an actress, Ivan, Hanna's husband who is also a photographer, and their son Anton. No one yet knows Sophie's love for Ivan. Soon after, she finds herself in Marseille again.

Cast
 Maren Eggert as Sophie
 Alexis Loret as Pierre
 Marie-Lou Sellem as Hanna
 Devid Striesow as Ivan
 Louis Schanelec as Anton
 Emily Atef as Zelda

References

External links

2004 films
2000s German-language films
2004 drama films
Films directed by Angela Schanelec
German drama films
2000s German films